609 is a year.

609 may also refer to:

 BA609: The Bell/Agusta BA609 is a civil twin-engined tiltrotor aircraft, being developed by Bell/Agusta Aerospace Company (BAAC), a joint venture between Bell Helicopters and AgustaWestland
 Area code 609
 609 (number)